The Dean of Fredericton is an Anglican dean in the Anglican Diocese of Fredericton of the Ecclesiastical Province of Canada, based at Christ Church Anglican Cathedral in Fredericton.

The incumbents have been :

References

Deans of Fredericton
Deans of Frederiction